The Mexican Lucha libre, or professional wrestling promotion International Wrestling Revolution Group (IWRG) has produced and scripted a number of wrestling shows since their creation on January 1, 1996 by promoter Adolfo "Pirata" Moreno. In 2015, IWRG held a total of 77 shows, an average of 1.48 shows per week, all in Arena Naucalpan. On twelve occasions the main event of the show was a championship match and on six occasions the main event was a Lucha de Apuestas, or "bet match".

2015 events

Footnotes

See also
 2015 in professional wrestling

References

External links
}
 

2015 in professional wrestling
professional wrestling
International Wrestling Revolution Group shows